Russia participated in the Eurovision Song Contest 2005 in Kyiv, Ukraine. The Russian entry was selected through a national final, organised by the Russian broadcaster Channel One Russia (C1R). Natalia Podolskaya represented Russia with the song "Nobody Hurt No One", which placed 15th and scored 57 points at the contest.

Before Eurovision

Evrovidenie 2005 - Vybirayet Rossiya 

Evrovidenie 2005 - Vybirayet Rossiya (retroactively often referred to as Nacionalny Otbor na Evrovidenie 2005) was the third edition of Evrovidenie, the music competition that selects Russia's entry for the Eurovision Song Contest. The competition consisted of three semi-finals and a final held on 4, 11, 18 and 25 February 2005, respectively. All shows took place at the Studio 1 in Ostankino Technical Center in Moscow, hosted by Andrey Malakhov and Yana Churikova and broadcast on Channel One as well as online via the broadcaster's website 1tv.ru.

Format 
The format of the national final consisted of four shows: three semi-finals with ten acts each on 4, 11 and 18 February 2005, and a final on 21 February 2005. The top three entries of each semi-final as determined by a public televote proceeded to the final, during which the winner was selected exclusively through the public televote. In order to cater to the three time zones in Russia, all four shows were broadcast live three times and therefore the competing artists had to perform their song three times. All regions participated in the voting via telephone and SMS, with the results being announced during the final broadcast for Western Russia.

Competing entries 
On 11 January 2005, C1R announced a submission period for interested artists and composers to submit their entries until 1 February 2005. 57 entries were shortlisted from the received submissions and a jury panel selected the 30 semi-finalists for the national final on 1 February 2005. The jury consisted of Konstantin Ernst (general manager of C1R), Yuriy Aksyuta (music director of C1R), Igor Matvienko (composer and producer), Maxim Fadeev (composer and producer), Viktor Drobysh (composer and producer), Alexey Charykov (composer and producer), Ilya Bachurin (vice president of MTV Russia), Artur Gasparyan (music editor for Moskovskij Komsomolets), Vladimir Polupanov (music editor for Argumenty i Fakty), Maxim Kononenko (editor-in-chief of Dni.ru), Larisa Havkina (journalist for Komsomolskaya Pravda), Vladimir Matetsky (singer-songwriter and producer), Maksim Dunayevsky (composer), Larisa Dolina (singer), Alexander Malinin (singer) and Larisa Sinelshikova (media manager and producer).

Semi-final 1
The first semi-final took place on 4 February 2005. Ten entries competed and a public televote exclusively selected the top three entries to proceed to the final. The three qualifiers were "No More War" performed by Jam and Yelena Terleyeva, "Shadows Dance All Around Me" performed by Anastasia Stotskaya and "Not That Simple" performed by Dima Bilan. In addition to the performances of the competing entries, 2000 Russian Eurovision entrant Alsou, 2004 Russian Eurovision entrant Julia Savicheva and singer Alexander Malinin performed as guests.

Semi-final 2
The second semi-final took place on 11 February 2005. Ten entries competed and a public televote exclusively selected the top three entries to proceed to the final. The three qualifiers were "Nobody Hurt No One" performed by Natalia Podolskaya, "Letala da pela" performed by Varvara and "Lusille is My Name" performed by Chay Vdvoyom. In addition to the performances of the competing entries, singers Anzhelika Varum, Larisa Dolina and Leonid Agutin performed as guests.

Semi-final 3
The third semi-final took place on 18 February 2005. Ten entries were to compete, however Sergey Mazaev was disqualified from the competition after being late for the Siberia run of the live show and nine entries ultimately competed. A public televote exclusively selected the top three entries to proceed to the final. The three qualifiers were "Identify Yourself" performed by Irina Schott, "Balalayka" performed by Aleksandr Panayotov and Alexey Chumakov and "I Wanna Be the One" performed by Slava. In addition to the performances of the competing entries, 2001 Russian Eurovision entrants Mumiy Troll and 2002 Russian Eurovision entrants Prime Minister performed as guests.

Final
The final took place on 25 February 2005 where the nine entries that qualified from the preceding three semi-finals competed. The winner, "Nobody Hurt No One" performed by Natalia Podolskaya, was determined exclusively by public televoting. A jury panel also provided commentary and feedback to the artists during the show and selected "Not That Simple" performed by Dima Bilan as having the best performance. In addition to the performances of the competing entries, 1995 Russian Eurovision entrant Philipp Kirkorov and singers Afric Simone, Bonnie Tyler, Valeriya performed as guests.

At Eurovision
Since Russia placed within the top 10 countries (excluding the Big Four) in the 2004 Contest, Russia pre-qualified to compete directly in the final of the Eurovision Song Contest 2005. On 22 March 2005, Russia was drawn to perform 20th in the final on 21 May 2005, following Greece and preceding Bosnia and Herzegovina.

For the Russian performance, Podolskaya was joined on stage by bassist Toni Hintikka, guitarist Valeriy Drobysh, drummer Teijo Jamsa, and backing vocalists Yana Kozlova and Olga Belaya. After the voting concluded, Russia scored 57 points and placed 15th. Since Russia was not among the top 10 countries (excluding the results of the Big Four), Russia did not qualify to compete directly in the final of the 2006 Contest and would have to compete in the semi-final.

The semi-final and final were broadcast on Channel One, with commentary by Yuriy Aksyuta and Elena Batinova. The voting spokesperson for Russia was Yana Churikova.

Voting

Points awarded to Russia

Points awarded by Russia

References

2005
Countries in the Eurovision Song Contest 2005
Eurovision